Paula is a Canadian animated short film, directed by Dominic-Étienne Simard and released in 2011. The film depicts urban life through the interactions of Paula, a street prostitute in Montreal, with various people in and around the neighbourhood of Hochelaga-Maisonneuve.

The film premiered in December 2011 at the Sommets du cinéma d'animation.

The film won the Canadian Screen Award for Best Animated Short Film at the 1st Canadian Screen Awards, and was a Prix Jutra nominee for Best Animated Short Film at the 14th Jutra Awards.

References

External links
 
 Paula at the National Film Board of Canada

2011 short films
2011 films
Canadian animated short films
National Film Board of Canada animated short films
Best Animated Short Film Genie and Canadian Screen Award winners
Quebec films
2010s Canadian films